Polydolopimorphia is an extinct order of metatherians, more closely related to extant marsupials than other extinct mammals. Known from the Paleocene-Pliocene of South America and the Eocene of Antarctica, they were a diverse group during the Paleogene, filling many niches, before declining and becoming extinct at the end of the Neogene. It is divided into two suborders, Bonapartheriiformes, and Polydolopiformes  The morphology of the teeth suggests that polydolopimorphians may be crown group marsupials, nested within Australidelphia. The group contained omnivorous, frugivorous and herbivorous forms.

Taxonomy 
Taxonomical subdivision of the Polydolopimorphia:
 Suborder Bonapartheriiformes
 Family Bonapartheriidae 
 Genus Bonapartherium 
 Genus Epidolops 
 Family Argyrolagidae 
 Genus Anargyrolagus 
 Genus Argyrolagus 
 Genus Hondalagus 
 Genus Klohnia 
 Genus Microtragulus 
 Genus Proargyrolagus 
 Subfamily Chulpasiinae 
 Genus Chulpasia 
 Genus Thylacotinga 
 Family Prepidolopidae 
 Genus Incadolops 
 Genus Perrodelphys 
 Genus Punadolops 
 Family Rosendolopidae 
 Genus Hondonadia 
 Genus Rosendolops 
 Suborder Polydolopiformes
 Family Polydolopidae 
 Genus Amphidolops 
 Genus Antarctodolops 
 Genus Archaeodolops 
 Genus Hypodolops 
 Genus Kramadolops 
 Genus Pliodolops 
 Genus Polydolops 
 Genus Pseudolops 
 Family Sillustaniidae 
 Genus Sillustania 
 Genus Roberthoffstetteria 
incertae sedis
 Genus Prepidolops 
 Genus Wamradolops 
 Genus Bobbschaefferia

References 

Metatheria
Danian first appearances
Piacenzian extinctions